and a body to remember with is a book of short stories by the Chilean-Canadian writer Carmen Rodríguez. It was written and published almost simultaneously in both English and Spanish (as De Cuerpo Entero). The book was short-listed for the City of Vancouver Book Award (1997) and won the City of Santiago Book Award (1998)

References

2002 short story collections
Canadian short story collections